General Daniel Cerri is a town located in the Bahía Blanca Partido of Buenos Aires Province, Argentina.

References

Populated places in Buenos Aires Province
Bahía Blanca Partido
Populated coastal places in Argentina